Sandrine Musso (born 15 January 15, 1973 Antananarivo - 7 August 2021 Gardanne) was a French anthropologist, specialist in health issues.

Life 
She obtain a PhD in anthropology from School for Advanced Studies in the Social Sciences. In 2011, she was a lecturer at Aix-Marseille University, She was a researcher at Centre Norbert Elias. She was visiting scholar at Senter for kvinne- og kjønnsforskning

She studied public health and minority groups.

Works

References 

2021 deaths
French anthropologists
1973 births